In the 2005–06 season Panathinaikos played for 47th consecutive time in Greece's top division, Alpha Ethniki. They also competed in UEFA Champions League and Greek Cup. Season started with Hans Backe as team manager.

Squad
As of 24 February 2007.

Competitions

Alpha Ethniki

Classification

Greek Cup

Matches

UEFA Champions League

Qualifying phase

Third qualifying round

Group C

References

External links
 Panathinaikos FC official website

Panathinaikos F.C. seasons
Panathinaikos FC season